Pedro Afonso, Count of Barcelos (before 1289 – May 1350), was an illegitimate son of King Denis of Portugal and Grácia Frois. He was made the 3rd Count of Barcelos on 1 May 1314.

Biography

Much like the other illegitimate children of King Denis, Pedro Afonso was raised by Queen Elizabeth of Portugal along with his half-brothers and -sisters at court. The children were sent at an early age to live there as a political, not charitable necessity, as they were seen as a method of cementing alliances and creating a network of influence within the courts of Europe. King Denis in his October 1298 will stated that the Queen would specifically administer and instruct his illegitimate children, and provided that they would be disinherited if they were to dishonour or disobey the authority of Infante Afonso.

The Count always counted on the protection and support of his father, receiving dominion over lands in Lisbon, Estremoz, Evoramonte, Sintra and Tavira, among others. He soon became an important manager, from 1306, of the inheritances that the king bestowed.

In 1307, he became the steward to Beatrice of Castile.

With the conflicts that developed between Denis and the crown prince Afonso, the King invested his illegitimate son with the title of Count of Barcelos (in 1317), at the time, a non-hereditary title in the kingdom.Pedro Afonso remained on the King's side during the initial phases of the civil war, between 1319 and 1324. At the same time he continued to stay close to the Crown Prince. After disagreements with his brothers João Afonso and Afonso Sanchez, principal opponents of Afonso, he was seen as doing a disservice to the King and exiled to Castile, where he remained between 1317 and 1322.

On returning from exile in 1322, he looked to reconcile with his father, in order to recuperate his lost titles and properties. At the same time, he attempted to fill the role of conciliator between Denis and the Infante Afonso, alongside his stepmother, Queen Elizabeth.

After the death of Denis in 1325, and the accession to the throne of the Infante Afonso as Afonso IV of Portugal, Count Pedro Afonso began to occupy his time in the parish of Lalim, near Lamego, limiting himself to interventions with his brother Afonso against the Crown of Castile. In this role he was seen as "the strong arm, and strong blow, that drowned the resistance in their own blood".

Afonso named royal representative to the peace agreement between the kingdoms of Castile and Portugal, but illness prevented him from accompanying Archbishop Gonçalo Pereira to the meeting.

Francisco Brandão indicated that Pedro Afonso was recognized at Court (in Portugal, Castile and Aragon) as a man of "great opinion, discreet, valorous, and generally applauded by those of important rank in Spain".

Following his "retirement" to the civil parish of Lalim, Pedro Afonso was credited with a group of literary works on various themes, including the Crônica Geral de Espanha (1344) and the Livro de Linhagens, in addition to the Livro das Cantigas.

He died in 1354 at his home in the Paço de Lalim, and was buried in the Monastery of Tarouca.

Marriages
Count Pedro was married first to Branca Peres de Sousa, the daughter of wealthy and powerful courtiers, Pedro Eanes de Portel and Constança Mendes de Souza, and had one child who died in infancy. In his five-volume work, the Monarquia Lusitania, Friar Francisco Brandão reported that the child was buried in Santa Maria dos Olivares, in Tomar, where the church records refer to the burial of "a nephew of King Denis".

Queen Elizabeth, ever involved in the marriage alliances, arranged his second marriage, around 1300, with Maria Ximénez Cornel (who was later buried in the Monastery of Santa Maria de Sigena), one of the Queen's Aragonese ladies-in-waiting, and the daughter of a powerful Aragonese nobleman, Pedro Cornel.

After the death of Maria Ximénez, the Infante married for a third time, this time with Teresa Annes, a lady-in-waiting to the Queen Consort of Portugal Beatrice of Castile, wife of the King Afonso IV.

Ancestry

Notes

Sources

External links
Project on the final section of Crónica Geral de Espanha de 1344

1288 births
1354 deaths
House of Burgundy-Portugal
Portuguese nobility
13th-century Portuguese people
14th-century Portuguese people